Lasiopa is a genus of flies in the family Stratiomyidae.

Species
Lasiopa aksarayiensis Üstüner & Hasbenli, 2014
Lasiopa aktasii Üstüner & Hasbenli, 2014
Lasiopa balius (Walker, 1849)
Lasiopa benoisti Séguy, 1930
Lasiopa calva (Meigen & Wiedemann, 1822)
Lasiopa carpenteri James, 1937
Lasiopa caucasica (Pleske, 1901)
Lasiopa edentula (Wiedemann, 1824)
Lasiopa krkensis Lindner, 1938
Lasiopa manni Mik, 1882
Lasiopa martinezi Mason, 1997
Lasiopa pantherina Séguy, 1930
Lasiopa peleteria Brullé, 1833
Lasiopa pseudovillosa Rozkošný, 1983
Lasiopa rhodesiensis (Lindner, 1952)
Lasiopa rufitarsis Strobl, 1906
Lasiopa tsacasi Dušek & Rozkošný, 1970
Lasiopa villosa (Fabricius, 1794)

References

Stratiomyidae
Brachycera genera
Taxa named by Gaspard Auguste Brullé
Diptera of Africa
Diptera of Asia
Diptera of Australasia
Diptera of Europe
Diptera of North America